Volvarina porcellana is a species of sea snail, a marine gastropod mollusk in the family Marginellidae.

Description
The shell size is up to 15 mm

Distribution
This species is found off Argentina and the South Orkneys.

References

 Engl, W. (2012). Shells of Antarctica. Hackenheim: Conchbooks. 402 pp

Marginellidae
Gastropods described in 1912